Eugene Bardach is an American political scientist. He is an emeritus professor at the Goldman School of Public Policy at the University of California, Berkeley. He is known for developing the eightfold path framework of policy analysis that is commonly used in public policy and public administration scholarship.

Biography 
Bardach received his B.A. from Columbia University in 1961 and PhD from the University of California, Berkeley in 1969. He began teaching at Berkeley after receiving his PhD, and took a short leave of absence to work for the Office of Policy Analysis at the United States Department of the Interior. His scholarship has focused on policy implementation and public management as well as how to improve interorganizational collaboration in service delivery. He served as acting dean of the Goldman School of Public Policy in 1997 and in 1987–1988.

Bardach is the author of A Practical Guide for Policy Analysis, a widely used textbook in public policy programs that is based on his experience teaching the principles of policy analysis and then helping students execute their projects. The book was known for introducing a concrete plan of action to students and scholars wishing to perform a public policy analysis.

Bardach was elected to the American Academy of Arts and Sciences in 2017.

References 

Living people
Public administration scholars
Columbia College (New York) alumni
University of California, Berkeley alumni
Fellows of the American Academy of Arts and Sciences
Goldman School of Public Policy faculty
American political scientists
Year of birth missing (living people)